The 2012 Flintshire Council election took place on 3 May 2012 to elect members of Flintshire Council in Wales.  This was on the same day as other 2012 United Kingdom local elections.

Results

|}

Nine seats (5 Lab, 2 Con, 1 Ind & 1 LD) out of seventy were elected unopposed.

References

Flintshire
2012